James Craig Hanks (born October 16, 1961) is an American philosopher and Professor of Philosophy at Texas State University. He is known for his expertise on critical theory and philosophy of technology. Hanks has been the Chair of Philosophy at Texas State University since 2014.

Books
 Refiguring Critical Theory: Jürgen Habermas and the Possibilities of Political Change, University Press of America, 2002
 Philosophy and Critical Thinking (Texas State University Philosophy 1305), Thomson, 2006
 Technology and Values: Essential Readings (ed.), Wiley-Blackwell, 2010
 Technological Musings: Reflections on Technology and Values, forthcoming
 Technology and Transcendence, forthcoming

References

External links
Craig Hanks at Texas State University
Craig Hanks CV

21st-century American philosophers
Continental philosophers
Philosophy academics
Political philosophers
Texas State University faculty
Living people
Texas A&M University alumni
Duke University alumni
University of Alabama in Huntsville faculty
Bioethicists
Critical theorists
1961 births